The 2010 United States Senate election in Maryland was held on November 2, 2010. Primary elections were held on September 14, 2010. Incumbent Democratic U.S. Senator Barbara Mikulski won re-election to a fifth term.

Background 
According to The Baltimore Sun columnist David Nitkin, Mikulski had indicated she planned to seek re-election to a fifth term. If Mikulski were to win re-election and serve the full term, she would tie Paul Sarbanes as the longest-serving senator in state history, and also becoming the longest-serving female senator in history, turning 80 years old in the process. On February 15, 2010, rumors began to circulate that Mikulski would not seek reelection; however, these were denied by Democratic sources soon after.

She previously won senate elections in 1986, 1992, 1998, and 2004 by margins of 21, 42, 41 and 31 percentage points, respectively. Additionally, in the general election, state parties were expected to focus much of their attention on the seats of Governor Martin O'Malley and first-term Congressman Frank Kratovil, the latter of whom won a surprise victory in a conservative district of the state. Nitkin and Larry Sabato's Crystal Ball considered her seat as overwhelmingly "safe."

Primary results

Democratic primary

Results

Republican primary

Candidates

Nominee
 Eric Wargotz, Queen Anne's County Commission President

Eliminated in primary
 Joseph Alexander
 Barry Steve Asbury, newspaper publisher
 Neil Cohen, dentist
 Stephens Dempsey
 Samuel R. Graham, Sr.
 John B. Kimble, perennial candidate
 Gregory Kump
 Daniel W. McAndrew
 Jim Rutledge, attorney
 Eddie Vendetti, engineer

Results

General election

Candidates

Major 
 Barbara Mikulski (D), incumbent U.S. Senator
 Eric Wargotz (R), Queen Anne's County, Maryland Commission President (elected) and physician

Minor 
 Don Kaplan (Independent)
 Richard Shawver (Constitution)
 Kenniss Henry (Green)
 Natasha Pettigrew (deceased) was the Green Party candidate. On September 19, while cycling, Pettigrew was hit by an SUV. Her mother, Kenniss Henry, was chosen by the Green Party to replace Pettigrew on the ballot.

Campaign 
Wargotz released two television ads, in the first he created and introduced the term "insidersaurus": comparing Mikulski to a dinosaur by calling her a political "insidersaurus"     being in Washington for over thirty years (a long-term political incumbent.) A second ad showed a hammer hitting a brick wall, breaking it down and citing criticisms of Mikulski's record as a U.S. Senator. Mikulski released advertisements emphasizing education and job creation.

Despite Wargotz's limited campaign and resources he received the highest percentage of votes against Mikulski as an incumbent U.S. Senator (over 20 years.)

Debates 
Despite repeated requests by the Wargotz Campaign formal debate was declined by the incumbent U.S. Senator Mikulski. The two candidates did appear together on Maryland Public Television (MPT) fielding common questions posed to both by the moderator but no formal debate was held.

Predictions

Polling

Fundraising

Results

References

External links 
 Maryland State Board of Elections
 U.S. Congress candidates for Maryland at Project Vote Smart
 Maryland U.S. Senate from OurCampaigns.com
 Campaign contributions from Open Secrets
 2010 Maryland Polls graph of multiple polls from Pollster.com
 Election 2010: Maryland Senate from Rasmussen Reports
 Maryland Senate from Real Clear Politics
 2010 Maryland Senate Race from CQ Politics
 Race profile from The New York Times
 Candidate blogs at The Baltimore Sun
Official campaign sites
 Barbara Mikulski for U.S. Senate incumbent
 Daniel W. McAndrew for U.S. Senate
 Jim Rutledge for U.S. Senate
 Vaughn for U.S. Senate
 Wargotz for U.S. Senate
 Neil Cohen for U.S. Senate

United States Senate
Maryland
2010